Ward MacLaughlin Miller (November 29, 1902 – March 11, 1984) was an American politician of the Republican party. He briefly served in the U.S. House of Representatives from November 1960 to January 1961.

Biography 
Miller was born in Portsmouth, Ohio in 1901. He earned his high school diploma from Portsmouth High School. In 1923, he earned a bachelor of arts degree from Ohio State University (Columbus, Ohio). In 1931, he was awarded a master of arts degree by Harvard University (Cambridge, Massachusetts).

Congress 
On November 8, 1960, Miller won a special election to complete the term of Democratic U.S. Representative James G. Polk, who had died in office on April 28, 1959 (thus creating one of the longest vacancies in the U.S. Congress in modern times). However, the 86th Congress had already adjourned, and did not return for a post-election lame-duck session. Since Miller had not run for election to a full term in the 87th Congress, his membership in the House of Representatives ended on January 3, 1961, and he never was sworn in.

Death
He died in Portsmouth in 1984.

References

See also
 
 List of United States representatives from Ohio

1984 deaths
1902 births
Ohio State University alumni
Harvard University alumni
People from Portsmouth, Ohio
20th-century American politicians
Republican Party members of the United States House of Representatives from Ohio